Thomas Coffin may refer to:

 Thomas Coffin (Lower Canada politician) (1762–1841), Canadian politician, member of the Legislative Assembly of Quebec
 Thomas Coffin (Nova Scotia politician) (1817–1890), Canadian politician, member of the Canadian House of Commons and the Receiver General
 Thomas C. Coffin (1887–1934), United States Representative from Idaho